General George James Ludlow, 3rd Earl Ludlow GCB (12 December 1758 – 16 April 1842), was a British peer and soldier.

Military service

Ludlow served in the British Army as a captain during the American Revolutionary War. Following the British surrender at Yorktown, he was held as a prisoner of war (POW) in Lancaster, Pennsylvania. In May 1782, he was one of 13 POWs forced to draw lots to determine which one should be executed in retaliation for the execution of a patriot captain by loyalists, in what became known as the Asgill Affair. He rose to Colonel of the 1st Foot Guards 21 August 1795, and Major General 18 June 1798. In 1801 he served under Abercromby and Hely-Hutchinson in the Egyptian Campaign commanding the Guards Brigade, seeing action at Aboukir, and Alexandria (Canope). He was made Lieutenant General on 30 October 1805. In August 1807 he commanded the 3rd Division in the Copenhagen Campaign under Lord Cathcart. Ludlow was promoted General in June 1814. 

He was a Regimental Colonel in turn of the 96th Regiment of Foot, the 38th (1st Staffordshire) Regiment of Foot  and the Scots Fusiliers.

Family and peerage 
Ludlow was the younger son of Peter Ludlow, 1st Earl Ludlow, by Lady Frances, daughter of Thomas Lumley-Saunderson, 3rd Earl of Scarbrough. Ludlow succeeded his elder brother Augustus in the earldom in 1811. As this was an Irish peerage it did not entitle him to a seat in the House of Lords. However, in 1831 he was created Baron Ludlow in the Peerage of the United Kingdom, which enabled him to take a seat in the upper chamber of parliament.

Lord Ludlow died in April 1842, aged 83. He was unmarried and all his titles became extinct on his death.

References

External links

|-

|-

|-

|-

|-

1758 births
1842 deaths
3
Knights Grand Cross of the Order of the Bath
George
British Army generals
Royal Scots Fusiliers officers
Peers of the United Kingdom created by William IV